Chintapalli is a village and Gram panchayat in Karempudi mandal of Guntur district, Andhra Pradesh, India. As of 2022 year, new Palnadu District announced with Narsaraopet has administrative Capital.

It is located about 5 km from Karempudi Mandal Revenue office and about 90 km from Guntur city.

Santapille Lighthouse
There is an ancient Lighthouse called "Santapille Lighthouse" in the village. Its main objective is to warn about the danger of the Shoal six miles off the coast. It was first commissioned in 1840 and subsequently renovated in the years 1849, 1903 and 1995. This place gets more tourists and villagers on occasions such as Kartik Purnima and Naga Panchami.

Beautiful beach
This village has a beautiful beach and seasonal tidal effects are so beautiful. It is even more beautiful on the occasions like Kartik Purnima and Naga Panchami.

Culture and tradition
There is an ancient temple called "Samalamma Talli" which is 200 years old and looks very simple. The village people visits every day with family members.

References

External links
 Santapille Lighthouse at Wikimapia.com

Villages in Alluri Sitharama Raju district